Primera División A (Méxican First A Division) is a Mexican football tournament. This season was composed of Invieno 2001 and Verano 2002. Real San Luis was the winner of the promotion to First Division after winning Tiburones Rojos de Veracruz in the promotion playoff. However, Veracruz was also promoted to First Division after defeating Club León in a promotional series.

Changes for the 2001–02 season
Potros Marte was relocated to Acapulco and renamed Potros Guerrero.
Yucatán was bought by new owners, they relocated the team to Querétaro and renamed Querétaro F.C.
Real San Sebastián was relocated to Tuxtla Gutiérrez and renamed Atlético Chiapas.
Lobos UAP was relocated to Oaxaca and renamed Chapulineros de Oaxaca.
C.F. Monterrey and Tigres UANL exchanged their Primera A teams. Saltillo Soccer was moved to Ciudad Juárez and renamed Cobras Juárez and Tigres de Ciudad Juárez was moved to Saltillo and renamed Tigrillos Saltillo.
Águilas de Tamaulipas was promoted from Second Division. However, before the season started, the team was renamed Tampico Madero F.C.
Potros Zitácuaro was promoted from Second Division after winning a promotion playoff.

Stadiums and locations

Invierno 2001

Group league tables

Group 1

Group 2

Group 3

Group 4

General league table

Results

Reclassification series

First leg

Second leg

Liguilla 

(t.p.) The team was classified by its best position in the general table

Quarter-finals

First leg

Second leg

Semi-finals

First leg

Second leg

Final

First leg

Second leg

Top scorers

Verano 2002

Group league tables

Group 1

Group 2

Group 3

Group 4

General league table

Results

Reclassification series

First leg

Second leg

Liguilla

Quarter-finals

First leg

Second leg

Semi-finals

First leg

Second leg

Final

First leg

Second leg

Top scorers

Relegation table

Promotion final
The Promotion Final faced Real San Luis against Veracruz to determine the winner of the First Division Promotion. San Luis was the winner.

First leg

Second leg

First division promotion playoff
The Mexican Football Federation decided to increase the number of teams in the Primera División to 20 participants, so it was decided to play a promotion series between León, the last place in the Primera División relegation table, and Veracruz, Primera A season runner-up. Finally, Veracruz was the winner the team was promoted to Primera División. However, there was already a team in Veracruz, the owners decided to transfer the team promoted to Tuxtla Gutiérrez, where it was renamed as Jaguares de Chiapas.

First leg

Second leg

Relegation playoff
A relegation series faced Chapulineros de Oaxaca, last team in the Primera A relegation table, against Astros de Ciudad Juárez, Second Division runner-up.

First leg

Second leg

References

2001–02 in Mexican football
Mexico
Mexico
Ascenso MX seasons